Leslie Dam is a locality in the Southern Downs Region, Queensland, Australia.

Geography 
The locality is on the Darling Downs, an area of extensive agriculture. Due to this geography Sandy Creek and its tributaries flow from the south of the locality merging into a single stream through the gap between the mountains of the north-east and Mount Steele and below to the northernmost part of the locality. Leslie Dam is built across that gap, forming Lake Leslie as a water reservoir.

History 
The locality takes its name from the dam, which in turn was named after the Leslie family, who were pioneer pastoralists on the Darling Downs.

References 

Southern Downs Region
Localities in Queensland